Katarina Håkansson (born 18 March 1966) is a Swedish judoka. She competed in the women's half-heavyweight event at the 1992 Summer Olympics.

References

1966 births
Living people
Swedish female judoka
Olympic judoka of Sweden
Judoka at the 1992 Summer Olympics
Sportspeople from Uppsala
20th-century Swedish women